Gallois is a French surname. Notable people with the surname include:

Jean Gallois (abbot) (1632–1707), French scholar and abbé
Louis Gallois, (born 1944), French businessman
Patrick Gallois (born 1956), French flutist and conductor
Pierre Marie Gallois (1911–2010), French air-force brigadier-general

See also
Raymond Gallois-Montbrun (1918–1994), French violinist and composer

French-language surnames